Neil Christopher Saunders (born 7 May 1983) is a former professional footballer who played as a midfielder. He last played for Exeter City in League One, before retiring due to injury in 2010.

He has played international futsal for England.

Career
Saunders was born in Dagenham, east London. He was a member of Watford's youth academy for ten years before being offered professional terms by the then manager Gianluca Vialli. Despite playing regularly for the reserves, Saunders failed to make a first team appearance for the club, and joined Conference National club Barnet on a free transfer in August 2003. He played only once for Barnet's first team.

He played for Team Bath while studying for a BA degree in Coach Education and Sports Development at the University of Bath. He contributed to their promotion to the Premier Division of the Southern League in the 2003–04 season. Appointed club captain for the 2005–06 season, he missed most of the campaign with a knee injury. At the end of the 2006–07 season he received the manager's Player of the Year award, having led the team to runners-up spot in the Premier Division, missing out on promotion to the Conference South after losing to Maidenhead United in the play-off final, and the tema's first victory in the Somerset Premier Cup.

He turned professional with Exeter City before the 2007–08 season, together with Matt Taylor rejoining their former Team Bath coach Paul Tisdale. However, Saunders was injured before the start of the season and it wasn't until 15 months later, in December 2008, that he finally made his debut for Exeter, during a home game against Lincoln City. Scored his first goal in professional football with a 35-yard volley during Exeter's League Two match against Barnet in January 2009.

It was announced on 14 May 2010, that he had been released by Exeter, along with eight other players.

Saunders made his debut for England at Futsal in December 2004.

On 29 June 2010 Neil announced he was to retire from professional Football at the age of 27 due to his ongoing Knee injury preventing him from fulfilling his potential in the game

References

External links

1983 births
Living people
Footballers from Dagenham
English footballers
Association football midfielders
Watford F.C. players
Barnet F.C. players
Exeter City F.C. players
English Football League players
National League (English football) players
Alumni of the University of Bath
Team Bath F.C. players